The Sheep Creek Range is a mountain range in Lander County, Nevada northeast of Battle Mountain. It is the site of a doppler radar station.

References 

Mountain ranges of Nevada
Mountain ranges of Lander County, Nevada